Jessica Enström (born 1977) is a Swedish handball player. She has played for the club IHV Västerås and for the Swedish national team. She competed at the 2008 Summer Olympics in China, where the Swedish team placed eight.

References

External links

1977 births
Living people
Swedish female handball players
Handball players at the 2008 Summer Olympics
Olympic handball players of Sweden